Yang Jingren (1918 – October 19, 2001) was a People's Republic of China politician. A member of the Hui people ethnic group, he was born in Lanzhou, Gansu Province. He was the head of the United Front Work Department from 1982 to 1985.

1918 births
2001 deaths
Hui people
People's Republic of China politicians from Gansu
Chinese Communist Party politicians from Gansu
Political office-holders in Ningxia
Vice Chairpersons of the National Committee of the Chinese People's Political Consultative Conference